Jason Spisak is an American voice actor, producer, and computer programmer in animation and video games, and producer and founding member of Blackchalk Productions. He is also the co-leader of the Symphony OS Project and the designer of Symphony's unique Mezzo desktop environment and wrote the Laws of Interface Design, for which the project tries to adhere to in its designs. He was previously a co-founder of Lycoris.

Filmography

Voice over roles

Animation

Anime

Film

Video games

Live action roles

Television

Film

References

External links
 
 
 
 KJZZ 91.5 FM – Stories by Jason Spisak
 On Commuting to LA (April 12, 2005)
 Searching for the Best Gas Prices (October 12, 2005)
 Real estate coaster leaves one man in the dumps (April 28, 2006)
 Jason Spisak on Squirrel Boy Premiere (July 14, 2006)
 Seriously, not taking the news seriously. (October 6, 2006)
 Spisak's "real" news (October 12, 2006)

20th-century American male actors
21st-century American male actors
Living people
Actors from Pennsylvania
American computer programmers
American male video game actors
American male voice actors
Open source people
Year of birth missing (living people)